Judo at the 2009 Southeast Asian Games was held at the Chao Anouvong Gymnasium in Vientiane, Laos from 15 to 17 December 2009.

Medal summary

Medalists

Men

Women

External links
 25th SEA Games Official Report

2009 Southeast Asian Games events
2009
Asian Games, Southeast